Bepton is a village, Anglican parish and civil parish in the Chichester district of West Sussex, England. According to the 2001 census it had 104 households with a population of 249 of whom 117 were economically active.

History
Bepton (Babintone) was listed in the Domesday Book (1086) in the ancient hundred of Easebourne as having 23 households: 10 villagers, 10 smallholders and three slaves.  With ploughing land and a church, it had a value to the lord of the manor of £5. The lord was an unspecified Geoffrey, and the tenant-in-chief was Earl Roger of Shrewsbury.

In Kelly's Directory of 1867, the church of St Mary was described as "an ancient flint building in the Anglo-Norman style, and has a nave, chancel, and tower".

In 1931 its population was recorded as 292.

Transport

References

External links

 Bepton Parish Council
 St Mary's Church
  Bepton guide
 Further historical information and sources at British History Online
Further historical information and sources on GENUKI

Chichester District
Villages in West Sussex